Correctional Services Corporation v. Malesko, 534 U.S. 61 (2001), was a case decided by the United States Supreme Court, in which the Court found that implied damages actions first recognized in Bivens v. Six Unknown Named Agents should not be extended to allow recovery against a private corporation operating a halfway house under contract with the Bureau of Prisons.

A Bivens action is a civil rights violation suit against the government.  The Supreme Court limited this court-invented private right of action to exclude corporate defendants like Correctional Services Corporation.  Plaintiff's actions against the individual employees were barred by the statute of limitations because the names of the John Doe defendant prison guards (esp. Jorge Urena) were not known to the plaintiff.

See also
 List of United States Supreme Court cases, volume 534
List of United States Supreme Court cases

References

External links
 

Implied constitutional cause of action case law
Private prisons in the United States
United States Supreme Court cases
United States Supreme Court cases of the Rehnquist Court
2001 in United States case law